Catherine Carr may refer to:

Catherine Carr (screenwriter) (1880–1941), silent-film era screenwriter
Cathy Carr (swimmer) (born 1954), American swimmer
Cathy Carr (singer) (1936–1988), singer

See also
Rosalind Wade (1909–1989), British novelist and short story writer, who also wrote under the name Catharine Carr
Katy Carr (disambiguation)